Blake Thomas Gillikin (born January 21, 1998) is an American football punter for the New Orleans Saints of the National Football League (NFL). He played college football at Penn State.

High school
A former resident of Smyrna, Georgia, Gillikin helped lead The Westminster Schools to its first Class AAA Georgia State Championship since 1978 in 2015, and was rated as a five-star punter and a five-star kicker by Kohl's Kicking Camp.

College career
A four-year starter at Penn State, Gillikin is ranked No. 2 on Penn State's career punting average charts (43.03 avg.) He landed 53 career punts downed inside the opponent's ten-yard line (seven in 2016, 18 in 2017, 12 in 2018, 15 in 2019) and is the only player in program history with seven punts of 65 or more yards. Gillikin is second all time in net punting yards in school history behind Jeremy Kapinos. In 2019, Gillikin averaged 42.2 yards per punt as was selected All-Big Ten honorable mention by the conference coaches and media. Was also selected for the CoSIDA Academic All-American first-team.

Professional career
Gillikin signed with the New Orleans Saints as an undrafted free agent on April 27, 2020. He was placed on injured reserve on September 9, 2020.

Gillikin was named the Saints starting punter for the 2021 season after the team released longtime starter Thomas Morstead in the offseason.

On March 16, 2023, Gillikin re-signed with the New Orleans Saints.

References

External links
New Orleans Saints bio
Penn State Nittany Lions bio

1998 births
Living people
Players of American football from Atlanta
American football punters
Penn State Nittany Lions football players
New Orleans Saints players